Hammanskraal is a functional, trans-provincial region anchored in northern Gauteng Province, South Africa. The region consists of multiple, residential, industrial and commercial areas in a decentralized settlement pattern.

History

The historical roots of the region trace back to the 13th century and it is noted that the area around Gauteng province was initially occupied by the Batswana. The Batswana Chief Mokgatla dominated the area to the north of what we know today as Gauteng province and his descendants are known as the Bakgatla.

To this day, nearly half of the population of the Hammanskraal region are descendants of the Batswana nation signifying this historical fact.

According to oral narration, the Amandebele A Lebello settled the area around Hammanskaal close to Ramotse in the 1800s. The Amandebele originated in the eastern part of the country and now form an integral part of the region's community 

The Great Trek that took place in the first half of the 19th century saw the inward movement of Dutch settlers from the Cape into the interior of South Africa. The Dutch settled the area to the north of what is today known as Pretoria in 1855. As time went by the Dutch settlers forcefully occupied land dispossessing the indigenous tribes in the process. The discovery of gold about 60 Kilometres to the south of Hammanskraal lead to a boom of economic activity in the region and the agricultural sector flourished.

Owing to the booming agricultural industry, a farmer by the name Hamman had a large agricultural venture where he owned a famous cattle barn. This barn was referred to in Afrikaans as Hammanskraal, named after the famous farmer.

The 1913 Natives Land Act and the implementation of the Apartheid laws by the 1940s saw a larger program of forced removals around the Pretoria, Witwatersrand and Vaal regions. These forced removals coupled with an increase of industrial activity saw an increase in the population of the Hammanskraal region.

With the increase in population numbers there was very little planning for the region. This ended up being a region of underserved residential neighborhoods serving as a dormitory town to surrounding industrial complexes with little development of infrastructure and industry within the region itself.

In 1972, the Bophuthatswana self governing state was established which had a profound impact on the developmental trajectory of the region. By 1977, Bophuthatswana had become an independent 'republic' in terms of the then government of South Africa's separate development policy.

As a result, a large artificial barrier was drawn and effectively splitting the Hammanskraal Region into two different countries. This once again had a profound impact in the developmental trajectory of the area and resulted in the continued decentralized settlement model that persists today.

It is worth noting that the Bophuthatswana Government did make a contribution to the development of the area albeit it under an unpopular political context. The Bophuthatswana government is credited with driving economic development by the constructing of the Babalegi Industrial Development Zone in the 1970s  and the construction of the Carousel Casino in 1992. This and other investments in infrastructure, schools and utilities saw the generally underserved and overlooked region obtain some much needed economic injection in the 1980s and early 1990s.

Post the 1994 South African election, the region of Hammanskraal has seen a significant decline in service delivery, infrastructure and social development with the exception of the private sector investments leading to the building of shopping malls and private schools.

Geography

Location

The region of Hammanskraal is located on the Far Northern Boundary of Gauteng Province and is strategically located at a trade way hub linking the 
North West Province, Limpopo, Mpumalanga and Gauteng Province.

This makes Hammanskraal a Trans Provincial Region that functionally connected and spreads along 4 provinces. The only single Geographic area in South Africa that straddles 4 Provinces.

Boundaries

The boundaries are outlined in order to give definition to the Spatial composition of the Region.

The western boundary of the region is along the Stink Water River which separates Hammanskraal from Soshanguve. The Northern Boundary straddles Pienaarsrivier and Rust De Winter towards Limpopo Province and the eastern boundary is towards the Madala Game Reserve on the Border between Gauteng and Mpumalanga Provinces.

Spatial components

The purpose of this chapter is to outline the key spatial features that form part of this regions geographic landscape.

Hammanskraal is surrounded by an enormous agricultural environment. Agriculture is the base economic activity for the region. The area has a large concentration of grain and wheat farms and many farms producing animal feeds. Livestock and poultry farming is also very prevalent.

Natural Conservation is also a notable spatial component on the landscape of the Hammanskraal region. The Dinokeng Game Reserve to the east of the region is a large and well maintained natural asset. This game reserve also contributes to the growth of the tourism sector in the area. Other game reserves include the Madala Reserve to the far east of the region and many smaller private natural resorts and recreation sites.

A key environmental issue in Hammanskraal is water supply. The Apies River cuts straight through the area after collecting water in the Pretoria area. Due to poor maintenance and water purification practices, the supply of water to the region is sub-standard. Those who can afford make use of underground water sources however, the input costs of this practice are quite high and as a result, access to quality water in the region causes an environmental and health concern.

The remainder of the spatial composition of the region consists of a combination of rural and urban residential settlements in a decentralized model and, a industrial development zone at Babelegi which is now partially functional and a cluster of retail offerings.

Area analysis

Based on a geographic study, the area is studied to draw conclusions on the:

1) Human behavioural 
2) Environmental  
3) Economic features

That give the area a special character.

Hammanskraal is a multifaceted, transitional environment moving from a traditionally rural and agriculturally intensive environment to a local hub for industry, transport and commercial activity. At a residential settlement scale, there is a fair mix between rural and urban settlement patterns with a concentration of the urban environment around the Temba, Ramotse areas while there is a large cluster of rural communities to the Northern part of the Region such as Mathibestad, Makapanstad and Danhouse.

Hammanskraal is increasingly urbanizing creating a need for facilitating urban infrastructure such as housing, functional utilities and increased health infrastructure.

There is a residual overflow of housing developments on the Southern Part of the Region. This area has a mix of subsidized housing and free title stands. The residual overflow to the south stretches towards the Apies River. Such an increase in housing developments indicate the larger population growth in the region particularly the urban settlement areas.

Situation assembly

There is generally a connection between transport infrastructure and urban patterns of settlement. Owing to the N1 highway, the Old Warmbaths Road and a railway line (only transports cargo and not people), the Hammanskraal region is functionally connected to the Gauteng City Region.

Governance

Majaneng in Hammanskraal is a rural village with a chief as its political head. It is also the site of schools such as Hans Kekana Secondary School, Tipfuxeni Secondary school, Sikhululekile Secondary school, Hammanskraal high school,Boitshepo Secondary School,Ratshepo Secondary School,Makgetse Secondary School,Kgetse Ya Tsie Secondary School, Mphe Batho Primary School, Thabo Ya Batho Middle and Kgapamadi High School and many more.

Maubane is a spatial area covering 7 villages in the Moretele Municipal area under the Chieftainship of Kgosi Phopholo Maubane, Site of schools such as Alfred Maubane Highschool, Mmatlhame Primary, Mmamarumo Primary, Bafedile Secondary school.

The area also hosted a police training college which contributed to a large growth of black policemen in Apartheid South Africa during the late 1980s.

Other areas of Hammanskraal governed by chiefs are Mathibestad and Makapanstad. The two are often a topic of conversation since there are people who believe the two do not fall under Hammanskraal while others believe strongly that they do. Mathibestad is under the governance of Bahwaduba, under Kgosi Mathibe. Makapanstad on the other hand is under the governance of Bakgatla, under Kgosi Makapan. It has been said that the chiefdom or Makapanstad is slowly transitioning into letting the larger government take over since Kgosi Boisi Makapan's death.

One of his eldest sons Nchaupe had taken over for a while until unclear political grievances arose against him and his adviser.

Notable people
 Kgosi Phopolo Maubane  - ex Chairperson of The House of Traditional Leaders and the Chief of Bakgatla Ba-Mocha in the Maubane village, North of Hammanskraal.
Herman Mashaba - Executive Mayor of Johannesburg under the Democratic Alliance (2017). Founder of hair care brand "Black Like Me", comes from Ramotse
 Aubrey Ngoma  - Mamelodi Sundowns player and ex-Cape Town City player comes from a small town called Ramotse.
Dr Malinga - Musician and Businessman  
Phetso Maphanga - Soccer star
Zipporah Nawa, member of parliament
Thapelo Aphiri, well known as ‘Javas’ in Scandal
The Superduo, Musical artists from Majaneng
Kgaogelo‘Decency’ Ntsweng - Musician

References

Populated places in the City of Tshwane
University of Pretoria campus